Karim Adel Abdel Fatah is an Egyptian footballer. He currently plays for Ghazl El-Mehalla in the Egyptian Premier League.

Career

Tersana
Abdel Fatah joined Tersana on 28 February 2007. Since the transfer window closes on 31 January in Egypt, some Egyptian league's clubs, such as Olympic Alexandria, showed their dissatisfaction towards that transfer and considered it illegitimate. However, the Egyptian Football Association issued an official statement explaining that Abdel Fatah terminated his contract with his previous club, El-Masry, due to financial disputes between him and his club. Therefore, he became a free agent and his transfer to Tersana is legal.

Olympic Alexandria
Abdel Fatah joined Olympic in summer 2008. He scored 7 league goals in the 2008-2009 Egyptian Premier League season making him the top goal scorer of his team. However, those 7 goals were not enough to save Olympic Alexandria from relegation to the Egyptian Second Division.

Ghazl El-Mehalla
Abdel Fatah signed a contract to join Ghazl El-Mehalla in July, 2009.

References

External links
 Karim Abdel Fatah Profile at FootballDatabase.eu

1982 births
Living people
Al Masry SC players
Tersana SC players
Olympic Club (Egypt) players
Egyptian footballers
Egyptian Premier League players
Smouha SC players
Ghazl El Mahalla SC players
Association football forwards